Franck Bussière (born 13 August 1975) is a French lightweight rower. He won a gold medal at the 2001 World Rowing Championships in Lucerne with the lightweight men's eight.

References

1975 births
Living people
French male rowers
World Rowing Championships medalists for France